Karl Bernhard Wiklund (15 March 1868 – 1934) was a professor in Finno-Ugric languages at Uppsala Universitet 1905–1933. His research were mainly in Sami languages, and he published several studies in Lule Sami language. He also made several studies in Sami ethnography and wrote school books in Sami, such as Nomadskolans läsebok.

He became a member of the Royal Swedish Academy of Sciences in 1930.

Bibliography 
selected
 Lule-lappisches Wörterbuch (1890) Reprinted 1969
 Laut- und Formenlehre der Lule-lappischen Dialekten (1891)
 Entwurf einer urlappischen Lautlehre (1896) PhD thesis
 Lärobok i lapska språket (1901) New edition 1915
 With Just Qvigstad: Dokumenter angaaende flytlapperne m.m., samlede efter renbeitekommissionens opdrag. Bind 2-4. Renbeitekommissionen af 1907. Kristiania [i.e. Oslo] 1909.
 Om lapparna i Sverige (1910) (pdf)
 Olof Rudbeck d.ä och lapptrummorna (1930)
 Lappar i nordligaste Sverige. (1937)

References 

Linguists of Sámi
Linguists from Sweden
Academic staff of Uppsala University
1868 births
1934 deaths
People in Sámi history
Burials at Uppsala old cemetery
Paleolinguists
Linguists of Indo-Uralic languages